The R179 road is a regional road in Ireland linking Kingscourt in County Cavan and the Republic of Ireland–United Kingdom border in County Monaghan. The road passes through the villages of Magheracloone, Knocknacran, and the town of Carrickmacross.

See also 

 Roads in Ireland
 National primary road
 National secondary road

References 

Regional roads in the Republic of Ireland
Roads in County Monaghan
Roads in County Cavan